David P. Hinkins is an American politician and a Republican member of the Utah State Senate representing District 26. Prior to redistricting he represented District 27. since January 1, 2009.

Personal life, education, and career
Hinkins attended Emery County High School and Utah Technical College in Provo, which is (now Utah Valley University). Hinkins is a businessman by profession, which has given him a substantial amount of wealth. Hinkins is married.

Background
Utah Forest Stewardship Committee 
CEU Trustee

Political career
Hinkins was elected to the Senate in 2008 and began his service in 2009.

In 2016, Hinkins served on the following committees: 
Infrastructure and General Government Appropriations Subcommittee
Natural Resources, Agriculture, and Environmental Quality Appropriations Subcommittee (Senate Chair)
Senate Business and Labor Committee
Senate Natural Resources, Agriculture, and Environment Committee

Elections
Senator Hinkins is currently up for reelection.

2012 
Hinkins had two challengers but was selected by the Republican convention for the November 6, 2012 General election, which he won with 25,111 votes (72.2%) against Democratic nominee Mike Binyon, who had run for a House seat in 2010.

2008 
When Democratic Senator Mike Dmitrich retired and left the seat open, Hinkins ran unopposed for the June 24, 2008 Republican Primary. He then went on to win the November 4, 2008 General election with 17,693 votes (54.4%) against Democratic nominee Brad King.

Legislation

2016 Sponsored Legislation 

Floor Sponsored Legislation:
 H.B. 5 Natural Resources, Agriculture, and Environmental Quality Base Budget
 H.B. 29 Transportation Interim Committee Reports Amendments
 H.B. 84 Wildlife Amendments
 H.B. 136 Human Trafficking Amendments
 H.B. 140 Public Utilities and Technology Committee Name Change
 H.B. 211 Agricultural Exemption Amendments
 H.B. 232 Scenic Byway Amendments
 H.B. 270 Constitutional Defense Restricted Account Amendments
 H.B. 276 Utah Public Land Management Act
 H.B. 284 Injured Wildlife Amendments
 H.B. 352 Cosmetology Amendments
 H.B. 391 Law Enforcement Revisions
 H.B. 415 Motor Vehicle Accident Cost Recovery
 H.B. 420 Unmanned Vehicle Amendments
 HCR 1 Concurrent Resolution on Waters of the United States
 HCR 16 Concurrent Resolution on Utah Public Lands
 HCR 17 Concurrent Resolution Opposing Unilateral Use of the Antiquities Act
 HJR 3 Joint Rules Resolution Changing an Interim Committee Name

Political positions

Hinkins voted against HB222, which would have expanded access to the National School Lunch Program, stating that it is the responsibility of parents to provide breakfast for children.

References

External links
Official page at the Utah State Senate
David Hinkins at Ballotpedia
David Hinkins at the National Institute on Money in State Politics

Place of birth missing (living people)
Year of birth missing (living people)
Living people
People from Emery County, Utah
Republican Party Utah state senators
Utah Valley University alumni
21st-century American politicians